Andreas Arnold (born 20 January 1941) is an Austrian bobsledder. He competed in the four-man event at the 1964 Winter Olympics.

References

1941 births
Living people
Austrian male bobsledders
Olympic bobsledders of Austria
Bobsledders at the 1964 Winter Olympics
Sportspeople from Tyrol (state)